Silas K. F. Chou (born 1946) is a Hong Kong billionaire, active in the fashion sector.

Early life
Chou's father was Chao Kuang-piu. His father founded South Ocean Knitters, one of the Hong Kong's "largest knitwear manufacturers and exporters", in which he still owns a stake.

His sister, Susana Chou, was the President of the Legislative Assembly of Macau from 1999 to 2009.

Career
In 1978, Chou and his father, founded Xiang Zhou Woollen Mills in the Zhuhai Special Economy District.

In 1989, Chou and Lawrence Stroll founded Sportswear Holdings to acquire Tommy Hilfiger. Chou was the largest shareholder and became chairman of the company. In 2006, he sold his shareholding to Apax, a UK private equity firm for US$1.6 billion.

In 2003, Chou and Stroll bought a majority share in Michael Kors for US$100 million. In June 2018, Chou sold the last of his investment in Kors.

In 2018, a consortium led by Stroll, which included Chou brought Force India out of administration and formed a new team Racing Point Force India.

Chou has also invested in Karl Lagerfeld and Pepe Jeans.

Personal life
Chou is married, with two daughters, Veronica and Vivian, and lives in Hong Kong. Both daughters are active in his fashion business.

References

Living people
Hong Kong billionaires
1946 births
Chou family
Wharton School of the University of Pennsylvania people
Hong Kong business executives